The Australia national cricket team toured England between May and September 2019 to play in the 2019 Cricket World Cup, the Ashes and tour matches against Worcestershire and Derbyshire. In the Cricket World Cup, Australia failed to defend the title they won in 2015 and were knocked out in the semi-finals.

Cricket Australia named a 25-man preliminary squad for the Test series. Ahead of the first Test, they were scheduled to play against the Australia A team. However, this match was replaced by a four-day, intra-squad warm-up match, with Brad Haddin and Graeme Hick named as mentors of the two 12-man teams. Australia retained the Ashes after winning the fourth Test to take an unassailable 2–1 lead in the series, but England's victory in the final Test meant the series was drawn 2–2, the first drawn Ashes series since 1972.

Tour matches

Four-day match: Brad Haddin XII vs Graeme Hick XII

Three-day match: Worcestershire vs Australia

Three-day match : Derbyshire vs Australia

Test series

1st Test

2nd Test

3rd Test

4th Test

5th Test

Notes

References 

2019